The 2011–12 season was the 109th in the history of the Southern League, which is an English football competition featuring semi-professional and amateur clubs from the South West, South Central and Midlands of England and South Wales.

The league allocations were released on 20 May 2011. From this season onwards, the Southern League was known as The Evo-Stik League Southern, following a sponsorship deal with Evo-Stik.

Premier Division
The Premier Division consisted of 22 clubs, including 15 clubs from the previous season and seven new clubs:
Two clubs promoted from Division One Central:
Arlesey Town
Hitchin Town

Two clubs promoted from Division One South & West:
A.F.C. Totton
Frome Town

Plus:
Barwell, promoted from Northern Premier League Division One South
Redditch United, relegated from the Conference North
St Albans City, relegated from the Conference South

Brackley Town won the Southern League Premier Division and were promoted to the Conference North along with play-off winners Oxford City.

Evesham United, Swindon Supermarine and Cirencester Town finished in the relegation zone and, as in the previous season, all three relegating clubs were placed to the Division One South & West, while Hemel Hempstead Town were reprieved from relegation for the second time in three seasons due to Conference Premier clubs demotion.

League table

Play-offs

Semi-finals

Final

Results

Stadia and locations

Division One Central
Division One Central consisted of 22 clubs, including 18 clubs from previous season and four new clubs:
Chalfont St Peter, promoted from the Spartan South Midlands League
Chertsey Town, promoted from the Combined Counties League
Fleet Town, transferred from Isthmian League Division One South
St Neots Town, promoted from the United Counties League

St Neots Town won the division in their inaugural season in the Southern League and were promoted to Premier Division along with play-off winners Bedworth United. Marlow finished bottom of the table and were relegated to the Hellenic League, while second bottom Fleet Town were reprieved from relegation due to Bedfont Town's resignation.

League table

Play-offs

Semi-finals

Final

Results

Stadia and locations

Division One South & West
Shortly before the start of the season Andover resigned from the league and folded. No replacement club was admitted and the season was played with 21 clubs. Therefore, relegation zone was reduced to one place in order to make up the numbers for the 2012-13 season.

Division One South & West consisted of 21 clubs, including 17 clubs from previous season and four new clubs:
Three clubs relegated from the Premier Division:
Didcot Town
Halesowen Town
Tiverton Town

Plus:
Poole Town, promoted as champions of the Wessex League

Bideford won the division and were promoted to the Premier Division along with play-off winners Gosport Borough. Stourport Swifts finished bottom of the table and were relegated.

League table

Play-offs

*AET

Semi-finals

Final

Results

Stadia and locations

League Cup

The Southern League Cup 2011–12 (billed as the RedInsure Cup 2011–12 for sponsorship reasons) is the 74th season of the Southern League Cup, the cup competition of the Southern Football League.

Preliminary round

First round

Second round

Third round

Quarter-finals

Semi-finals

Final

See also
 Southern Football League
 2011–12 Isthmian League
 2011–12 Northern Premier League

References

External links
Official website

Southern Football League seasons
7